Veliky (also Veliky, Velikyi, Velykyi, etc., masculine; Cyrillic: Великий) or Velikaya (also Veliykaya or Velikaia feminine) means large, great/grand, or combines these two meaning in several Slavic languages. It is the surname of the following notable people:

Anna Velikiy (born 1982), Israeli volleyball player
Oleg Velyky (1977–2010), Ukrainian and German handball player
Sofya Velikaya (born 1985), Russian fencer

See also
 Petr Veliky (disambiguation)
 Veliky (disambiguation)

Russian-language surnames